Magnus Torell (born 1 August 1964) is a Swedish windsurfer. He competed at the 1988 Summer Olympics and the 1992 Summer Olympics.

References

1964 births
Living people
Swedish male sailors (sport)
Swedish windsurfers
Olympic sailors of Sweden
Sailors at the 1988 Summer Olympics – Division II
Sailors at the 1992 Summer Olympics – Lechner A-390
Sportspeople from Gothenburg